The Volvo B10BLE was a rear-engined low-entry single-decker bus chassis manufactured by Volvo in Sweden between 1993 and 2004. The first prototypes were built in 1992, but mass production started in 1993, only a year after the high-floor B10B. It was popular in Australia, Scandinavia and the United Kingdom. It had the engine mounted on the rear overhang of the bus. It became the successor of the city bus version of the B10B and was used as a base for single-decker buses worldwide. The B10BLE was available in diesel powered format, and later in a compressed natural gas powered format with the fuel tanks on the roof of the bus. Its low-floor design was widely promoted by Volvo when it was first launched, on the basis of added convenience to the passengers, and the increase in transport efficiency due to the low-floor design.

The production of the diesel powered variants ended in 2001 to give way for B7RLE and B12BLE, while the CNG variants were produced until 2004. In the United Kingdom market, Volvo unsuccessfully tried to replace the B10BLE with the B7L in 2001, but realised that it was not as popular among the customers and offered the B7RLE from 2003. This situation was similar to B10L one, which was replaced by B10BLE in 1997, three years after B10L was introduced here and also due to limited success.

Specifications
It is an inline six-cylinder four-stroke diesel engine with a turbocharger and intercooler. This engine used a dry sump system due to being horizontally mounted. The engine has a power output of either . The engine is able to meet Euro II emissions limits.

The name of the chassis stands for:
B - Bus
10 - 10 (9.6) litre engine
B - Back/Rear mounted engine
LE - Low-entry

Optionally available is a Volvo GH10-series (GH10A, GH10B, GH10C) natural gas or biogas engine. All generations of this engine are inline four-stroke six-cylinder spark-ignition engines with a turbocharger and intercooler. The GH10A and GH10B engines were lean-burn engines and the GH10C is a "mixed-lean" engine, operating on an optimised balance between stoichiometric and lean-burn combustion strategies. The GH10C is able to meet Euro IV emissions limits.

Operators

Australia

In Australia, Sydney Buses purchased 125, Westbus 41 and Grenda Corporation 16.

Europe
In mainland Europe, B10BLEs were bodied by Säffle/Aabenraa, Carrus and other local manufacturers.

Singapore

In Singapore, all SBS Transit B10BLEs were bodied by Volgren.

One diesel-powered demonstrator (SBS1688K) was introduced in 1997 and scrapped in 2015 after reaching its 17-year lifespan. It was also SBS's first low entry bus.

The other 12 were CNG powered. 2 units entered service in April and July 2002, initially serving Jurong Island routes. When the contract ended, these buses were redeployed to serve bus routes serving the far west of Singapore. The remaining 10 buses, which were kept in storage, entered revenue service in early 2006. Due to the scarcity of CNG refueling points in Singapore and various factors, all units were withdrawn by July 2019. Only the first two units were kept at St Andrew's Autism School and Tan Tock Seng Hospital for preservation while the later batches were all scrapped. The CNG buses are the last public buses to use plastic destination signages and are also the last non-wheelchair accessible single deck rigid buses in Singapore.

United Kingdom

In the United Kingdom, many of the B10BLEs had Wright Renown bodywork, and a small number received Alexander ALX300 bodywork. The original Plaxton Prestige also featured the Volvo chassis as an option, but very few of these were built.

References

External links

Vehicles introduced in 1992
B10BLE
Bus chassis
Low-entry buses
Tri-axle buses